SS Samuel Chase was a Liberty ship built in the United States during World War II. She was named after Founding Father Samuel Chase, an Associate Justice of the United States Supreme Court and a signatory to the United States Declaration of Independence as a representative of Maryland.

Construction
Samuel Chase was laid down on 12 September 1941, under a Maritime Commission (MARCOM) contract, MCE hull 23, by the Bethlehem-Fairfield Shipyard, Baltimore, Maryland; she was sponsored by Mrs. Lester E. Voss, the wife of the resident plant engineer at the Bethlehem-Fairfield Shipyard, and was launched on 22 February 1942.

History
She was allocated to American-Hawaiian Steamship Co., on 11 April 1942. On 14 June 1948, she was laid up in the National Defense Reserve Fleet, Wilmington, North Carolina. She was sold for scrapping on 19 January 1967, to Northern Metal Co., for $46,000. She was removed from the fleet, 26 January 1967.

References

Bibliography

 
 
 
 

 

Liberty ships
Ships built in Baltimore
1942 ships
Wilmington Reserve Fleet
Ships named for Founding Fathers of the United States